Utanokawa Dam is a gravity dam located in Yamaguchi prefecture in Japan. The dam is used for flood control and irrigation. The catchment area of the dam is 6.1 km2. The dam impounds about 13  ha of land when full and can store 1614 thousand cubic meters of water. The construction of the dam was started on 1972 and completed in 1980.

References

Dams in Yamaguchi Prefecture
1980 establishments in Japan